Prince Oscar of Sweden may refer to:

 Prince Oscar Bernadotte (1859–1953), second son of King Oscar II
 Prince Oscar, Duke of Skåne (born 2016), only son and second child of Victoria, Crown Princess of Sweden